Elections for the City of Edinburgh District Council took place on 1 May 1980, alongside elections to the councils of Scotland's various other districts. The Conservatives, who had previously controlled a majority on the council, were reduced to being just shy of a majority. The Conservatives continued to rule the council however, with Liberal support.

The election saw 4 new wards being added to Edinburgh; Fort, Shandon, Haymarket, and Tollcross. All, minus Tollcross, (which was won by the Conservatives) were won by Labour.

Turnout was 160,330.

Aggregate results

Ward Results

References

1980
1980 Scottish local elections
1980s in Edinburgh